The 1975 World Women's Handball Championship took place in the Soviet Union between 2-13 December 1975. It was the sixth edition of the World Women's Handball Championship and the first to be held in the Soviet Union.

East Germany won their second title after they finished top of the final group ahead of the Soviet Union and Hungary.

Qualification
Host nation
 

Defending champions
 

Qualified from the 1974 African Championship
 

Qualified from Asia
 

Qualified from the Americas
 

Qualified from European play-offs

Preliminary round

Group A

Group B

Group C

Final round

Group 10-12

Group 7-9

Final Group

Final standings

References

 International Handball Federation

World Handball Championship tournaments
W
W
W
Sports competitions in Kyiv
Sport in Rostov-on-Don
Sports competitions in Vilnius
20th century in Vilnius
1970s in Kyiv
International sports competitions hosted by Ukraine
Women's handball in the Soviet Union
December 1975 sports events in Europe
Ice